is a railway station on the Hokuriku Main Line in the town of Minamiechizen, Fukui Prefecture, Japan, operated by the West Japan Railway Company (JR West).

Lines

Station layout
The station consists of two opposed side platform connected by a level crossing. There is no station building. The station is unattended.

Platforms

Adjacent stations

History
Minami-Imajō Station opened on 10 June 1962.  With the privatization of Japanese National Railways (JNR) on 1 April 1987, the station came under the control of JR West.

Passenger statistics
In fiscal 2016, the station was used by an average of 16 passengers daily (boarding passengers only).

Surrounding area
Hokuriku Tunnel

See also
 List of railway stations in Japan

References

External links

  

Railway stations in Fukui Prefecture
Stations of West Japan Railway Company
Railway stations in Japan opened in 1962
Hokuriku Main Line
Minamiechizen, Fukui